The Language Learning Centre (in Māori: Te Pūtahi Reo) is a self access language learning center that offers resources and facilities for those learning languages at Victoria University of Wellington.

Facilities 
Occupying the whole of the von Zedlitz building, the Centre comprises language laboratories, themed group study rooms, a computer suite as well as a self-access library that includes graded readers, films, self-study courses, textbooks and board games for all ten languages taught at Victoria (English, Māori, New Zealand Sign Language, French, Chinese, German, Italian, Japanese, Samoan and Spanish) as well as dozens of others. Recognising a lack of language learning resources for many Pacific languages it worked with local native speakers to launch an online platform for languages such as Māori, Samoan and Cook Islands Māori. The language laboratories within the Centre are equipped for teaching New Zealand Sign Language in addition to spoken languages.

Language Buddy Programme 
The Centre runs a Tandem Language Learning programme which allows students to work with a native speaker of their target language improving their conversation skills as well as learn about their counterpart's culture.

History 
The first language laboratory was established at 30 Kelburn Parade in 1967 by the then French Department. In 1974 a language laboratory component was formally introduced into the French programme in order to expose students to authentic materials. In 1989 the university's English Language Institute began placing a greater importance on independent language learning through what was then called the Self Access Centre, a key facility for its English Proficiency Programme (EPP). This later became known as the Language Learning Centre (LLC) and expanded to cater for students of other languages taught at Victoria as well as non-taught languages.

References 

1967 establishments in New Zealand
Alternative education
Language schools
Victoria University of Wellington